The Hylo Open, formerly known as the BMW Badminton Cup, BMW Open, Bitburger Masters, Bitburger Open and SaarLorLux Open, is an international badminton tournament held at the Saarlandhalle in Saarbrücken, Germany, since 1988. It was sponsored by the German automobile company BMW and German pilsner beer brewery Bitburger; since 2021, it is sponsored by Saarbrücken-based eye lubrication company Hylo.

In 2018, this event was selected as part of the BWF Tour Super 100. In 2021, the tournament was upgraded to Super 500 category tournament and was renamed Hylo Open, before got downgraded to Super 300 the next year.

Previous winners

Performances by nation

References

External links 
Official website in English

 
Recurring sporting events established in 1988
Badminton tournaments in Germany
1988 establishments in Germany